Harlow Phelps Rothert (April 1, 1908 – August 13, 1997) was an American athlete who competed mainly in the shot put.

Rothert attended Stanford University, where he competed in basketball, football, and track and field. He was named first-team All-Pacific Coast Conference in basketball in 1929. He won the NCAA shot put title three times, and set a world record for the event in 1930. Rothert competed in the shot put at the 1928 and 1932 Summer Olympics. He won a silver medal in the 1932 games, held in Los Angeles, and placed seventh in 1928.

Rothert earned his bachelor's degree in 1930 and law degree in 1937, both from Stanford. He was a trial lawyer who specialized in civil law. He founded a law firm in San Francisco, and taught at Stanford Law School and Hastings College of Law. During World War II, he spent two years in the Marine Corps.

In 1996, he was part of the Olympic Torch Relay. Around that time he had an acute inflammation in his legs and had to practice every day to cover the targeted 2 km distance using a specially designed walker. He died in 1997, aged 89.

References

1908 births
1997 deaths
All-American college men's basketball players
American male shot putters
Athletes (track and field) at the 1928 Summer Olympics
Athletes (track and field) at the 1932 Summer Olympics
Olympic silver medalists for the United States in track and field
Stanford Cardinal football players
Stanford Cardinal men's basketball players
Stanford Cardinal men's track and field athletes
Stanford Law School alumni
University of California, Hastings faculty
Track and field athletes from California
Medalists at the 1932 Summer Olympics
American men's basketball players